Paddock, Nebraska may refer to the unincorporated communities of:

Paddock, Holt County, Nebraska
Paddock, Merrick County, Nebraska